Ichmoul District is a district of Batna Province, Algeria.

Municipalities
Ichmoul
Foum Toub
Inoughissen

Districts of Batna Province